Giovanni Lilliu (born in Barumini, Italy on 13 March 1914 – died in Cagliari, 19 February 2012), was a renowned archeologist, academician, publicist and politician and public figure and an expert of the Nuragic civilization. Largely due to his scientific and archeologic work in the Su Nuraxi di Barumini in Sardinia, Italy, the site was inscribed on the UNESCO list of World Heritage Sites in 1997.

Bibliography
La civiltà dei Sardi dal neolitico all'età dei nuraghi, Torino, 1967
"I nuraghi della Sardegna" dans le vie d'Italia, 1953 
La civiltà dei Sardi dal Neolitico all'età dei Nuraghi, Torino, 1963
Sculture della Sardegna nuragica, Cagliari, 1966
La civiltà nuragica, Sassari 1982
Cultura e culture, Sassar, 1995
Arte e religione della Sardegna prenuragica, Sassari 1999 .
La costante resistenziale sarda, Nuoro, 2002 
La civiltà dei Sardi dal Paleolitico all'età dei Nuraghi, Nuoro 2004

I nuraghi. Torri preistoriche di Sardegna, Nuoro 2005 
Sardegna Nuragica, Nuoro 2006 
Sardegna e Mediterraneo negli scritti di Giovanni Lilliu Volumes 1-6, 2008

References

Italian archaeologists
Italian politicians
1914 births
2012 deaths
Members of the Institute for Catalan Studies
20th-century archaeologists